The 2014 Netball Superleague Grand Final featured Manchester Thunder and Surrey Storm. This was the second grand final featuring Thunder and Storm. The two teams previously met in the 2012 grand final which Thunder won by two points. After winning the regular season without losing a match, Storm, with a team featuring player/coach Tamsin Greenway and Rachel Dunn, started the final as favourites. At half-time they were leading 26–22 and after three quarters were still ahead at 38–36. However Thunder, coached by Tracey Neville and featuring Sara Bayman, remained a threat throughout the match. With the score at 48–48 and twenty five seconds on the clock, pressure from Jodie Gibson saw Storm lose possession. Thunder pounced on a loose ball and fed it to Helen Housby who subsequently netted a very late winner.

Route to the Final

Match summary

Teams

References

2014 Netball Superleague season
2014
Manchester Thunder matches
Surrey Storm matches
Netball Superleague